Solum is a former municipality in Telemark county, Norway.

The parish of Solum was established as a municipality January 1, 1838 (see formannskapsdistrikt). According to the 1835 census the municipality had a population of 3,557. Solum is located west of the city Skien, and encompassed districts such as Nenset, Tollnes, Flakvarp, Skotfoss, and Klyve. On 1 July 1916 an area with 1,042 inhabitants was moved to Skien, and on 1 July 1920 an area with 1,614 inhabitants was moved to Porsgrunn.

On 1 January 1964 the rest of Solum was incorporated into Skien, along with Gjerpen and Valebø district. Prior to the merger Solum had a population of 13,706.

The name
The municipality (originally the parish) was named after the farm Solum (Old Norse Sólheimar), since the first church was built there. The first element is sól f 'Sun' (here in the sense 'sunny'), the last element is the plural form of heimr.

References 

Former municipalities of Norway